The Frank Wallin House, at 608 N. Seventh St. in Hamilton, Montana, was built in 1897.  It includes Colonial Revival and Queen Anne architecture.  It was listed on the National Register of Historic Places in 1988.

It is described as having Queen Anne style elements including "the steeply pitched roof, placement of the porch, and spindled posts with decorative brackets", while Colonial Revival elements are the "hip roof of the porch and its triangular pediment".  It was owned by Frank Wallin from 1900 to 1917.  It is significant as "a classic example of working-class housing in Hamilton at the end of the nineteenth century."

References 

Houses on the National Register of Historic Places in Montana
Queen Anne architecture in Montana
Colonial Revival architecture in Montana
Houses completed in 1897
Houses in Ravalli County, Montana
Hamilton, Montana
National Register of Historic Places in Ravalli County, Montana
1897 establishments in Montana